Gonzalo García (born 1 October 1935) is a Uruguayan sailor. He competed in the Dragon event at the 1960 Summer Olympics.

References

External links
 

1935 births
Living people
Uruguayan male sailors (sport)
Olympic sailors of Uruguay
Sailors at the 1960 Summer Olympics – Dragon
Sportspeople from Montevideo